Mosagallu is a 2021 Indian techno thriller  film based on the true events of a large-scale technical support scam. Shot simultaneously in Telugu and English languages, the film is directed by Jeffrey Gee Chin, and written and produced by Vishnu Manchu under the banner of AVA Entertainment and 24 Frames Factory. The film features an ensemble cast that includes Manchu, Kajal Aggarwal, Suniel Shetty, Ruhi Singh, Navdeep and Naveen Chandra.

Principal photography began in June 2019. The film was scheduled to be released on 5 June 2020 but was postponed due to the COVID-19 pandemic. The film was made on an estimated budget of ₹51 crore (US$7 million), which was considered as false information by Manchu after watching movie's content and quality .

The Telugu version of the film was released on 19 March 2021 along with its dubbed versions in Hindi, Tamil and Kannada as Anu and Arjun, and in Malayalam as Arjun and Anu. Mosagallu movie which opened with decent numbers at the box-office turned out into an average movie with closing collections of around total worldwide collections is Rs 27.37cr share and Rs 38cr gross.

Plot 

Based on a true series of incidents that shook the Indian IT industry and conned $380 million (2,800 crores), the film is about cultural clashes — between generations, between east and west, and between rich and poor. A call center scam in India rips off millions of dollars of US taxpayers' money.

Born into a poor family, Anu and Arjun played by Kajal Aggarwal and Vishnu Manchu sketches out a plan for easy money. A group of youngsters team up and set up a call center and loots millions of dollars from the US tax payers. An upright cop Aajit Kumar Singh played by Bollywood actor Suniel Shetty takes the charge to nab them. After several failed attempts, he finally bursts the scam and unfolds the mysterious gang behind this scam.

Cast

Release 
The film was released on 19 March 2021 along with its dubbed versions in Hindi, Tamil and Kannada as Anu and Arjun and in Malayalam as Arjun and Anu.

Reception 

Times of India rated the movie 2.5 out of 5 mentioning Vishnu Manchu and Kajal Aggarwal deliver a decent performance. 123 Telugu called it an engaging thriller and rated 2.75 out of 5, it called Mosagallu a decent entertainer but devoid of logics. The movie received mixed reviews from the critics and audience. Popular website Greatandhra gave 2 out of 5 stars calling it a highly technical entertainer which could've been handled better. The critics rated 2.5 and the users given a rating of 3 out of 5 on the Telugu Samayam website, called the movie an average one and heaped praises on the performances of Vishnu and Kajal. India Glitz gave 2.5 out of 5. Sangeetha devi of The Hindu mentioned Mosagallu is partly engaging with no gripping story. [Eenadu]] was impressed with the movie's plot and performances of Vishnu, Kajal, Suniel Shetty and concluded the movie would've been if the screen play was a bit taut and the climax could've been handled better.

References

External links
 

2021 films
Indian action films
Indian multilingual films
English-language Indian films
Films postponed due to the COVID-19 pandemic
Techno-thriller films
2020s Telugu-language films
2021 thriller films
Films shot in Hyderabad, India
Films set in Hyderabad, India
Films set in the United States
Films shot in the United States
Films scored by Sam C. S.